Botche Candé (born 18 July 1955) is a Guinean Bissauan politician. Since 2020, he has been Minister of Interior in the government of prime minister Nuno Nabiam of Guinea Bissau.

References 

1955 births
Living people
Bissau-Guinean politicians
Interior ministers of Guinea-Bissau
Politics of Guinea-Bissau